The North Somerset Cricket League (NSCL) is a cricket league in England serving the North Somerset, Bristol and South Gloucestershire area.

History
The NSCL was founded in 1969, with the first season taking place the following year. The aim of the league was to provide competitive cricket, with the hope of maintaining the interest of youngsters in the sport.

There were six original members of the league; Chew Magna, Chew Stoke, High Littleton, Nailsea, Whitchurch and Stanton Drew; and the first match took place on 19 April 1970 between Stanton Drew and Chew Magna. From these small beginnings, the league has grown, and now comprises over 80 teams, playing in 9 divisions.

Due to this expansion, and the desire of teams to play on different days, in 2007 the divisional structure was reorganised into Saturday and Sunday conferences.  In 2009 a Sunday Premier Division was introduced, which allowed teams from higher leagues (such as the West of England Premier League) to compete without unbalancing the rest of the divisions.

Past winners

Saturday Conference Division 1
2007 Dyrham & Hinton
2008 Dyrham & Hinton
2009 Dyrham & Hinton
2010 Wrington
2011 Bear Flat
2012 Bear Flat

Sunday Conference Premier Division
2009 Keynsham CC
2010 Brislington CC
2011 Midsomer Norton CC
2012 Lansdown CC

Sunday Conference Division 1
2007 Keynsham
2008 Knowle
2009 Whitchurch CC, Somerset
2010 Whitchurch CC, Somerset
2011 Whitchurch CC, Somerset
2012 Bristol Bangladeshi's

Division 1 (pre-2007)

 
1970 Chew Stoke
1971 Chew Stoke
1972 Nailsea
1973 Barrow Gurney
1974 Barrow Gurney
1975 Headley Park
1976 Headley Park
1977 Lower Weston Sports
1978 Headley Park
1979 Barrow Gurney

1980 Headley Park
1981 Bishop Sutton
1982 Headley Park
1983 Brislington
1984 Weston-super-Mare 3
1985 Barrow Gurney
1986 Bishop Sutton
1987 Bishop Sutton
1988 Bishop Sutton

1989 Wrington
1990 Wrington
1991 Weston-super-Mare 3
1992 Exiles (Bath)
1993 Wrington
1994 Brislington
1995 Weston-super-Mare 3
1996 Stratton on Fosse
1997 Stratton on Fosse

1998 Stratton on Fosse
1999 Mells
2000 Bear Flat
2001 Harptree
2002 Bear Flat
2003 Bear Flat
2004 Stratton on Fosse
2005 Stratton on Fosse
2006 Bath 3

External links
 North Somerset Cricket League website

English domestic cricket competitions
Cricket in Somerset